Springhill Township is a township in Greene County, Pennsylvania, United States. The population was 349 at the 2010 census, down from 476 at the 2000 census.

Geography
The township is in the southwestern corner of Greene County and thus the southwestern corner of the state of Pennsylvania. It is bordered to the south and the west by West Virginia. Deep Valley, along the Pennsylvania Fork of Fish Creek, is the primary settlement in the township.

Demographics

As of the census of 2000, there were 476 people, 169 households, and 129 families residing in the township.  The population density was 21.5 people per square mile (8.3/km).  There were 224 housing units at an average density of 10.1/sq mi (3.9/km).  The racial makeup of the township was 98.74% White, 0.42% Native American, and 0.84% from two or more races.

There were 169 households, out of which 40.8% had children under the age of 18 living with them, 55.6% were married couples living together, 15.4% had a female householder with no husband present, and 23.1% were non-families. 16.6% of all households were made up of individuals, and 10.7% had someone living alone who was 65 years of age or older.  The average household size was 2.82 and the average family size was 3.13.

In the township the population was spread out, with 30.5% under the age of 18, 6.1% from 18 to 24, 30.7% from 25 to 44, 22.3% from 45 to 64, and 10.5% who were 65 years of age or older.  The median age was 33 years. For every 100 females, there were 91.2 males.  For every 100 females age 18 and over, there were 90.2 males.

The median income for a household in the township was $18,393, and the median income for a family was $22,857. Males had a median income of $36,250 versus $20,781 for females. The per capita income for the township was $10,364.  About 27.9% of families and 37.2% of the population were below the poverty line, including 53.6% of those under age 18 and 19.7% of those age 65 or over.

References

Townships in Greene County, Pennsylvania
Townships in Pennsylvania